The Lafnitz is a river in southeastern Austria and (briefly) western Hungary.

It rises near the border of Styria and Lower Austria, and flows in a generally southeastern direction through the towns of Rohrbach an der Lafnitz, Lafnitz, Markt Allhau, Wolfau, Wörth an der Lafnitz, Neudau, Deutsch Kaltenbrunn, Rudersdorf, Königsdorf, and Heiligenkreuz im Lafnitztal, and it empties into the Rába less than a kilometer inside Hungary, in the town of Szentgotthárd. For much of its length it forms the border between Styria and Burgenland.

References

External links
Lafnitz - habitat cross-linking on an Alpine pannonical river, European Commission

Rivers of Styria
Rivers of Burgenland
Rivers of Hungary
Ramsar sites in Austria
Rivers of Austria
International rivers of Europe